Pleasure is the ninth studio album by Swedish band Club 8. It was released via Labrador Records.

Background 
It was described as a record about love, sex and jealousy, and an expertly crafted, cool and clever “grown-up” pop record.

Reception 

Pleasure received positive reviews from critics. On Metacritic, the album holds a score of 74/100 based on 4 reviews, indicating "generally favorable reviews."

Track listing

References 

2015 albums
Club 8 albums
Labrador Records albums